Tio Papi is a 2013 American comedy-drama film directed by Fro Rojas and starring Joey Dedio, Elizabeth Rodriguez, Kelly McGillis and Frankie Faison.

Cast
Joey Dedio
Elizabeth Rodriguez
Kelly McGillis
Frankie Faison
Gabriella Fanuele
David Castro
Fátima Ptacek
Sebastian Martinez
Nicolette Pierini
Dax Roy

Release
The film was released in theaters on September 6, 2013.

Reception
The film has a 29% rating on Rotten Tomatoes.  Sandie Angulo Chen of Common Sense Media awarded the film three stars out of five.

References

External links
 
 

2013 comedy-drama films
2013 films
2010s English-language films